Qezel Qapi (also Romanized as Qezel Qapī and Qezel Qopī; also known as Qezelqūpī) is a village in Mokriyan-e Gharbi Rural District, in the Central District of Mahabad County, West Azerbaijan Province, Iran. At the 2006 census, its population was 1,935, in 395 families.

References 

Populated places in Mahabad County